Keith Carter (February 26, 1970 – February 3, 2016), also known as Big Kap and The Wardin, was an American hip-hop DJ who was born in New York City and was later based in Atlanta.

Career
In 1995, he was a member of hip hop supergroup The Flip Squad. He was well known for the 1999 album The Tunnel with Funkmaster Flex, named after the New York nightclub where he was a regular DJ. He died in Mableton, GA late on February 3, 2016, due to a heart attack. He was 45 at the time of his death. According to his road manager Ab Traxx, Keith dealt with diabetes, but he did not believe it was what caused his fatal heart attack. Keith was previously slated to work on a showcase in Atlanta on the day of his death, shortly after his passing, the event became a memorial for Keith.

Big Kap is also well known for a video that went viral in 2011 consisting of Notorious B.I.G. throwing a water bottle at Big Kap during a Summer Jam concert before storming off the stage in 1995.

Discography 
The Tunnel (1999)

References

1970 births
2016 deaths
American hip hop DJs
Musicians from New York City
The Flip Squad members